Live at Montreux is an album by Sun Ra recorded in the summer of 1976 at the Montreux Jazz Festival in Switzerland under the billing  Sun Ra and his Intergalactic Cosmo Arkestra. It was originally issued in 1977 on the Saturn label, with hand-drawn covers and reissued in 1978 on the Inner City label, with new artwork and song titles and musicians credited. It was first issued on CD by Universe Records in Italy, with poor sound quality and the track "On Sound Infinity Spheres" faded out early by about six minutes. The later Japanese P-Vine and US Inner City CDs both use earlier source tapes and are complete and unedited. A segment of the same Montreux concert (including material which was not included on the LP) appears on the 'Solo Piano & Montreux And Lugano' DVD on Transparency Records.

Track listing
All compositions by Sun Ra, except where noted

CD 1
"For the Sunrise" - 2:03
"Of the Other Tomorrow" - 7:41
"From Out Where Others Dwell" - 4:31
"On Sound Infinity Spheres" - 13:26
"The House of Eternal Being" - 9:31
"Gods of the Thunder Realm" - 6:54
"Lights on a Satellite" - 5:11
CD 2
"Take the "A" Train: Piano Intro" - 3:50
"Take the "A" Train" - 7:51 (Billy Strayhorn)
"Prelude" - 4:29
"El Is the Sound of Joy" - 9:21
"Encore 1" - 9:29
"Encore 2" - 7:29
"We Travel the Spaceways" - 4:31

Credits

Musicians
Danny Davis: Flute, Sax (Alto)
Marshall Allen: Flute, Sax (Alto)
John Gilmore: Sax (Tenor)
Chris Capers: Trumpet
Larry Bright: Drums
Stanley Morgan: Conga
Pat Patrick: Flute, Sax (Baritone)
Ahmed Abdullah: Trumpet
June Tyson: Dancer, Vocals
James "Ham" Jackson: Bassoon, Egyptian Drum
Elo Omo: Clarinet (Bass)
Sun Ra: Moog Synthesizer, Organ, Producer, Piano
Vincent Chancey: French Horn
Clifford Jarvis: Drums
Al Evans: Trumpet
Tony Bunn: Bass (Electric)
Hayes Burnett: Double Bass

Album art
Ken Haas: Cover Photo
Bob Blumenthal: Liner Notes
Elo Omo: Photography

References

2x12" vinyl release
2-disc CD release

Sun Ra live albums
Albums recorded at the Montreux Jazz Festival
1976 live albums
Inner City Records live albums